The Malagasy Air Force is the aerial warfare branch of the Madagascar People's Armed Forces.

History 
The Malagasy Air Force was founded in 1960 with mainly former French aircraft such as Douglas DC-3s, Max Holste MH.1521 Broussards and Dassault MD 312s. As of 1970, the air force had 400 personnel on strength, and operated 10 transport aircraft, 11 liaison aircraft, three trainer aircraft and 10 helicopters. The Malagasy Air Force received four MiG-17F fighters from North Korea in 1979. The first Mil Mi-8s were delivered in 1976, and two Antonov An-26s followed in 1980. Several Alouette IIIs were also received in the early 1980s. At an unknown time in the 1980s, the Malagasy Air Force received 10 MiG-21bis fighters and two MiG-21UM trainers. MiG-21s are confirmed to have been operational between 1990 and 2001. They flew little, and all of them were eventually put into storage.

In 2009 the Malagasy Air Force acquired four ex-Belgian Alouette IIs. For over a decade the only aircraft operational were Alouette IIs, CASA C-212s and some old light aircraft, as the last An-26 had been retired around 2009. In 2019 the Malagasy Air Force acquired a CASA/IPTN CN-235 to help replace some of its ageing equipment.

Organisation 
The Malagasy Air Force operates out of bases at Antalah, Antsohihy, Arivoniamamo, Diego Suarez, Fianarantsoa, Fort Dauphin, Majunga, Nosy-Be, Tamatave, and Tulear. The new CASA/IPTN CN-235 provides transport together with the helicopter fleet. Basic training is provided by a small fleet of Cessna 206s from South Africa. A Boeing 737 provides VIP transport.

Fleet

Current fleet

References

Notes

Bibliography
 

Military of Madagascar
Air forces by country
Military aviation in Africa